Quneitra Governorate ( / ALA-LC: Muḥāfaẓat Al-Qunayṭrah) is one of the fourteen governorates (provinces) of Syria. It is situated in southern Syria, notable for the location of the Golan Heights. The governorate borders the countries of Lebanon, Jordan and Israel, and the Syrian governorates of Daraa and Rif Dimashq. Its area varies, according to different sources, from 685 km2 to 1,861 km2. The governorate had a population of 87,000 at the 2010 estimate.  The nominal capital is the now abandoned city of Quneitra, destroyed by Israel before their withdrawal in June 1974 in the aftermath of the Yom Kippur War; since 1986, the de facto capital is Ba'ath City.

During the Syrian Civil War, most of the portions of the governorate that are not held by Israel were  taken by various opposition and Jihadist forces. In the summer of 2018, the rebel-held areas in the governorate were retaken by the Syrian government.

History
The area surrounding Quneitra has been inhabited for millennia. Palaeolithic hunter-gatherers are thought to have lived there, as evidenced by the discovery of Levallois and Mousterian flint tools in the vicinity. A settlement was established at least as early as the late Hellenistic period, and continued through the Roman and Byzantine times; it was known by the name "Sarisai". The settlement served as a stop on the road from Damascus to western Palestine. Saint Paul is said to have passed through the settlement on his way from Jerusalem to Damascus. The site of the Conversion of Paul was traditionally identified with the small village of Kokab, north-east of Quneitra, on the road to Damascus.

The governorate was established in 1964 by the merger of Quneitra District, which belonged to Rif Dimashq Governorate and Fiq District which belonged to Daraa Governorate. The reason for the establishment of this new governorate was the necessity to govern the Golan Heights as a single administrative unit due to its strategic and military importance along the borders with the newly established State of Israel.

Six-Day War
Most of the governorate was captured by Israel in the 1967 Six-Day War. The deserted city remained in Israeli hands for the next six years. However, Israel and Syria remained in a state of war throughout this period (and, indeed, to the present day). The town gained a fresh symbolic value; it was seen by the Syrians as "the badge of Syria's defeat, an emblem of hatred between Syria and Israel and a cross [Syrian President Hafez al-Assad] had to bear."

Yom Kippur War
During the first few days of the Yom Kippur War in 1973, Quneitra was briefly recaptured by the Syrian Army before it was repulsed in an Israeli counter-offensive. 
In the middle of October 1973 the Israeli counter-offensive started. The Syrians had massed nearly 1,000 tanks along a  front. With a massive concentration of tanks, the Israelis lashed into the Syrian forces. The Syrians at first fell back, but then managed to counterattack and drive back into occupied territory. Quneitra changed hands several times. Finally, Israeli armored units, closely supported by Phantoms and Skyhawk fighter jets performing close air support with napalm strikes against the forward Syrian units, halted the Syrian drive and turned the Syrian Army back.

Destruction of the city
A group of settlers from Merom Golan – a settlement established in 1967 – took over an abandoned bunker in Quneitra and declared it to be a new settlement called Keshet (Quneitra in Hebrew). The settlers also set about razing the existing town to the ground. The leader of Merom Golan, Yehuda Harel, and another Merom Golan member, Shimshon Wollner, initiated the destruction of Quneitra, which was carried out by the Land Development Administration of the Jewish National Fund. Harel later described what happened:

Wollner and Harel asked the Jewish National Fund to carry out the work, ostensibly to prepare an area for agricultural cultivation, but were refused as they did not have permission from the Israeli army. They then approached the Assistant to the Head of Northern Command and asked him to mark on a map which buildings the army needed. According to Harel,

The buildings were systematically stripped, with anything movable being removed and sold to Israeli contractors, before they were pulled apart with tractors and bulldozers.

The disengagement went into force on 6 June. On 26 June, the Syrian president Hafez al-Assad travelled to Quneitra where he pledged to return the rest of the occupied territories to Syrian control. Western reporters accompanied Syrian refugees returning to the city in early July 1974 and described what they saw on the ground. Time magazine's correspondent reported that "Most of its buildings are knocked flat, as though by dynamite, or pockmarked by shellfire." Le Mondes Syria correspondent, in a report for The Times, gave a detailed eyewitness description of the destruction:

Today the city is unrecognisable. The houses with their roofs lying on the ground look like gravestones. Parts of the rubble are covered with fresh earth furrowed by bulldozer tracks. Everywhere there are fragments of furniture, discarded kitchen utensils, Hebrew newspapers dating from the first week of June; here a ripped-up mattress, there the springs of an old sofa. On the few sections of wall still standing, Hebrew inscriptions proclaim: "There'll be another round"; "You want Quneitra, you'll have it destroyed."

Israel asserted that most of the damage had been caused in the two wars and during the artillery duels in between. Several reports from before the withdrawal did refer to the city as "ruined" and "shell-scarred"."Kuneitra, the ruined capital of the Heights". "Village life on the wild frontier of the Golan". The Times, 5 April 1974 The Times''' correspondent saw the city for himself on 6 May, a month before the Israeli withdrawal, and described it as being "in ruins and deserted after seven years of war and dereliction. It looks like a wild west city struck by an earthquake and if the Syrians get it back they will face a major feat of reconstruction. Nearly every building is heavily damaged and scores have collapsed."

Direct evidence of the city's condition was provided when it was filmed on 12 May 1974 by a British television news team which included the veteran journalist Peter Snow, who was reporting for Independent Television News on the disengagement negotiations. His report was broadcast on ITN's News at Ten programme. According to The Times correspondent Edward Mortimer, "viewers were thus afforded a panoramic view of the city, which had stood almost completely empty since the Syrian army evacuated it in 1967. It could be seen that many of the buildings were damaged, but most of them were still standing." After it was handed over, "very few buildings were left standing. Most of those destroyed did not present the jagged outline and random heaps of rubble usually produced by artillery or aerial bombardment. The roofs lay flat on the ground, 'pancaked' in a manner which I am told can only be achieved by systematic dynamiting of the support walls inside." Mortimer concluded that the footage "establishes beyond reasonable doubt that much of the destruction took place after 12 May—at a time when there was no fighting anywhere near Kuneitra."

The United Nations established a Special Committee to Investigate Israeli Practices Affecting the Human Rights of the Population of the Occupied Territories, which engaged a Swiss engineer Edward Gruner to investigate the damage. Gruner and a team of surveyors spent four months in Quneitra, documenting every building and its condition. His report concluded that Israeli forces had deliberately destroyed the city prior to their withdrawal, including almost 4,000 buildings and a large amount of infrastructure, of value estimated at 463 million Syrian pounds. The report's conclusions were subsequently adopted by the United Nations General Assembly. It passed a resolution on 29 November 1974 describing the destruction of Quneitra as "a grave breach of the [Fourth] Geneva Convention" and "condemn[ing] Israel for such acts," by a margin of 93 votes to 8, with 74 abstentions. The United Nations Commission on Human Rights also voted to condemn the "deliberate destruction and devastation" of Quneitra in a resolution of 22 February 1975, by a margin of 22 votes to one (the United States) with nine abstentions.

1990s
During negotiations with Israel on a peace agreements in the 1990s, Syria claimed the Israel–Syria demilitarised zone established under the 1949 Armistice Agreements as its territory, falling within the Quneitra Governorate. The Israeli government rejected the claims, as it would have led to Syria having territory west of the 1923 border between Mandatory Palestine and the French Mandate of Syria, which included Israeli kibbutzim established in the area before the Six-Day War.

Syrian Civil War

During the Syrian Civil War, by the autumn of 2014, most of the portions of the governorate that are not held by Israel, were captured by various opposition and jihadist forces, with only a small enclave remaining under pro-Ba'athist militias in the north. In June 2015, the rebels launched an offensive to capture the governorate, but were repelled by the Syrian Army. In October 2015, the rebels launched another offensive, which once again ended in a stalemate. Despite a semi-ceasefire set up by Russia and the US in September 2016, insurgents in the governorate declared a new offensive against the government forces there.

In June and July 2018, the rebel-held areas in the governorate was almost entirely retaken by the Syrian Army and its allies with Russian air support, with only a marginal part remaining at the hands of the ISIL-allied Khalid ibn al-Walid Army near the Jordanian border. The rebel groups of Ahrar al-Sham, Hay'at Tahrir al-Sham, Southern Front, Army of Islam, Criterion Brigades and Army of Free Tribes evacuated from the area to Idlib under an agreement with the Syrian government. In August 2018, Russia deployed its military police force to man several posts along the Bravo line of the buffer zone on the Golan Heights.На Голанских высотах появились четыре поста российской военной полиции  RIA Novosti, 14 August 2018.

Districts

The governorate is divided into two districts (manatiq). The districts are further divided into six sub-districts (nawahi):

 Quneitra District (al Qunaytirah), which is further officially divided into 4 sub-districts (nawahi):
 Quneitra Subdistrict (mostly in neutral zone since 1973)
 Jubata al-Khashab Subdistrict (a.k.a. Jabta Elhashab)
 Mas'ade Subdistrict (a.k.a. Massade; under Israeli occupation since 1967)
 Khishniyah Subdistrict (a.k.a. Hushnia; under Israeli occupation since 1967)
 Fiq District, which is further officially divided into 2 sub-districts (nawahi):
 Fiq Subdistrict
 Elmahjer Subdistrict

Demographics
Before the Six-Day War and Yom Kippur War, the Golan Heights comprised 312 inhabited areas, including 2 towns, 163 villages, and 108 farms. In 1966, the Syrian population of the Golan Heights was estimated at 147,613. Israel seized about 70% of the Golan Heights in the closing stages of the Six-Day War. Many of these residents fled during the fighting, or were driven out by the Israeli army, and some were evacuated by the Syrian army. A cease-fire line was established and large parts of the region came under Israeli military control, including the town of Quneitra, about 139 villages and 61 farms. Of these, the Census of Population 1967'' conducted by the Israeli Defence Forces listed only eight, including Quneitra. One of the remaining populated villages, Shayta, was partially destroyed in 1967 and a military post built in its place. Between 1971–72 it was destroyed completely, with the remaining population forcibly transferred to Mas'ade, another of the populated villages under Israeli control.

Prior to the 1967 Six-Day War, the population of Quneitra governorate was between 130,000 and 145,000, of which about 17,000 were Palestinian refugees. The rural and urban population of Quneitra governorate consisted of Druze Arabs living in the north of the governorate, Circassians (descendants of refugees who fled their homeland in the Caucasus during the Tsarist-Circassian genocide in the 19th century), Turkmens, Arab Alawites, Arab Sunni Fellahin and Bedouin. The urban population of the city of Quneitra included Isma'ili and Shi'a Muslim Arabs. Others had previously moved to the Caucasus after the fall of the Soviet Union. The Golan Heights was the principal concentration of Syrian Circassians in the entire country.

The population of Syrian-ruled portions of Quneitra Governorate in 2021 was estimated to be 105,124. Prior to the Syrian Civil war, about 8.5% of Palestinian refugees living in Syria, lived in Quneitra Governorate. The total number of refugees and descendants from Israeli-occupied Golan Heights was estimated to be more than 350,000, mostly living in and around Damascus. Israeli occupied Golan Subdistrict has a population of about 50,000, half of whom are Syrian Arab, and the other half are Israeli settlers living in settlements deemed illegal under international law.

See also 
 Druze in Syria

References

External links
 equnaytra The First Complete website for qunaytra news and services

 
Governorates of Syria